Lawrence Mack Sampleton, Jr. (born September 25, 1959 in Waelder, Texas) is a former American football tight end in the National Football League for the Philadelphia Eagles, from 1982–1984, and the Miami Dolphins in 1987. He was drafted by the Eagles in the second round of the 1982 NFL Draft. He played college football at Texas.

Sampleton currently serves on the board of directors of the Secondary School Admission Testing Board and Director of Admission and Financial Aid for the Prairie View A&M Foundation.

References

1959 births
Living people
American football tight ends
Texas Longhorns football players
Philadelphia Eagles players
Miami Dolphins players
National Football League replacement players